Day-Timer is an American manufacturer of personal organizers  and other paper-based time management and organizational tools.  It was founded in 1951 and by the 1980s had a popular and successful business.  In the 21st century, however, the company has suffered due to competition from electronic devices with similar functionality.

Origins and growth 
The Day-Timer product began with Morris Perkin, an attorney for the Allentown, Pennsylvania, law firm of Perkin, Twining & Christie.  The basic idea of what Perkin called Lawyer's Day is that it provided two loose-leaf pages that combined five different types of record keeping into one place: a record of what time was spent with which client on what work, an appointment book for meetings and events, a reminder or "tickler" of things that needed to be done each day, a daily/weekly/monthly plan of work to be done, and a permanent record of work activities.  Initially Perkin made Lawyer's Day just for himself, but colleagues in the firm saw its advantages and wanted it for themselves. 

Starting in 1951, Perkin offered the Lawyer's Day product for mail order from an address in Allentown.  He used an Allentown printer for that but things did not work out.  Subsequently it was published by Fallon Press in New York, but that collaboration also failed to prosper.  

Then in 1956, Dorney Printing was given the job of producing the product.  Located in East Texas, Pennsylvania within Lower Macungie Township, Dorney Printing had been around since at least 1940.  It was being run by the three Dorney brothers, in partnership with their mother, in a business that the brothers had once labored on in a converted chicken coop with their late father.  The family operation was known for printing calendars for local churches, as well as local advertising products, school yearbooks, and the like. 

Another product called Accountant's Day was formed for that occupation.  By 1959, the product had been given the generic name "Day-Timer" and was reported to have met a positive notices nationwide in the financial, advertising, and architectural worlds.  This acceptance by professionals continued into the 1960s, and by 1963 Perkin's company was known as Day-Timers, Inc.  The product was offered in various sizes ranging from full letter-paper size down to small pocket-sized versions.  A subsidiary Day-Timers Canada, Ltd. was created and did well as well.

Initially the Day-Timers product was a "filler" job for the family, but once it took off, it became the bulk of what they were printing.  They expanded into a full-sized production facility in East Texas.  The collaboration between Perkin and the Dorneys was going well and Perkin decided to buy Dorney Printing and make it a subsidiary.  Perkin was president of Day-Timers, Inc. and brother Robert Dorney, who had coordinated the printing work with Perkin, was vice president and general manager.  By the end of the 1960s, Day-Timers, Inc. had some 300,000 customers and 125 employees.  Most sales were coming via direct mail. 

In 1972, the company was acquired by Beatrice Foods, which kept a hands-off approach.  Perkin died in 1976, after which Robert Dorney became president of Day-Timer.  Then in 1998, American Brands acquired Day-Timer and made it part of what would become ACCO Brands.

Product and popularity 

Day-Timer makes a variety of desk diaries, organizers, and pocket calendars.  The main Day-Timer product has a page for each day, with spaces for annotating various kinds of activities; there is also a pull-out calendar which can provide a view of the year as a whole.  In addition the product has calendar inserts which can be changed on a regular basis.  Day-Timer also offers a container for storage of prior years' books.

By 1986, Day-Timer had some $100 million in sales and about 3 million customers, mostly executives and professionals.  Day-Timer was especially ubiquitous among its original base, lawyers, with the company estimating that a fifth of all practicing lawyers in America used one.  There were around 800 full-time employees at the East Texas facility and the product did well even in downturned economic times as there was always a demand for tools that could provide greater managerial efficiency.

By the 1980s there was a large market for paper datebooks, and a number of companies were making them.  The Day-Timer product was especially popular among ambitious professionals.  
Filofax was perhaps Day-Timer's biggest competitor.  

Datebooks and personal organizers tended to inspire loyalty to that particular brand; as one story in The Morning Call newspaper began, "Some people cannot live without their Day-Timer Day Planners."  A factory store at the East Texas facility became a popular destination for Day-Timer customers.  One enthusiastic Day-Timer customer was quoted as saying, "Only compulsives can do this system. But there are a lot of us out there."  Public figures who enthusiastically used Day-Timers included Dwight Eisenhower, Bob Hope, and Lorne Greene.

Effect of computers 

Initially, Day-Timer's paper products co-existed with the advent of personal computers.  The popularity of Day-Timer was of the level that       early PC personal information manager (PIM) applications such as Borland Sidekick could print out appointment pages in Day-Timer format, for physical insertion into a Day-Timer book.  Early on there was a collaboration with Lotus 1-2-3 that did not work out.   

In the mid-late-1990s, the company did have a successful PC product in the PIM space, called Day-Timer Organizer.  Following the acquisition of Chronologic Corporation and their program Install Recall, the reworked and rebranded Day-Timer Organizer for Windows was released in 1994.  As one review of the new product said, it kept a "zealous dedication to the hard-copy Day-Timer metaphor."  Day-Timer Organizer went through several versions and was well-received, twice winning Editor's Choice awards from PC Magazine.  Later versions, such Day-Timer Organizer 2000, still kept their resemblance to the Day-Timer paper product.  The Day-Timer Organizer product competed with Lotus Organizer.

With the advent of smartphones, the appeal of a mobile software representation of Day-Timer seemed apparent.  An agreement was reached with The SCO Group to build a mobile app named DT4 for the BlackBerry and other devices and work on it was well underway, but that collaboration fell through.  In 2009, Day-Timer did introduce a calendaring app for the iPhone.  The year 2012 saw the introduction of a replacement app, called Plan2Go, with Android phones supported as a platform in addition to the iPhone.

But by 2014 that app had been discontinued and the company was offering no software application of any kind, marketing itself as a purely paper solution.  This is a stance it has continued into the 2020s.

Corporate changes and relocation 

Paper-based personal organizers continued to lose market share to digital versions and electronic devices.  Additionally, Day-Timer struggled during the Great Recession, and in 2009 reduced employees' pay in lieu of conducting layoffs.

During 2012, ACCO Brands merged with MeadWestvaco, which also had other personal organizer products such as At-A-Glance and Day Runner; to eliminate redundancies, corporate heads decided to shut down Day-Timers' historical Lehigh Valley headquarters, with the loss of 300 jobs there, and shift Day-Timer product operations to  corporate facilities in New York, Ohio, and Illinois.  This was another blow to this part of the Lehigh Valley, which had previously seen factory closings from the likes of Mack Trucks and Ingersoll Rand.

Nonetheless, there is still a market for those who prefer and use the paper form for personal organizers and calendars, for whom Day-Timer has continued to make products.

See also 
 FranklinCovey

References

External links 
 Official website

Companies established in 1951
Companies based in Lehigh County, Pennsylvania
1951 establishments in Pennsylvania
Printing companies of the United States
Manufacturing companies based in Pennsylvania
Personal information managers